Edward Lincoln Lewis was the Archdeacon of St Davids from 1929 until 1936.

Lewis was born in 1865 and educated at the St David's College, Lampeter. He was ordained deacon in 1891, and priest in 1892.  After curacies at Llanelly, and Llanwnda, he was Chaplain to the Bishop of St David's, John Owen. He held incumbencies in Llandyfaelog, Manorowen and Penally. He died in 1938.

References

1865 births
1938 deaths
Alumni of the University of Wales, Lampeter
Archdeacons of St Davids
Church in Wales archdeacons
20th-century Welsh Anglican priests
19th-century Welsh Anglican priests